Juan de Jarava (16th century) was a Spanish writer and physician. He is well known for his work in the field of botany and natural philosophy.

Works 
 
 I Quattro Libri della Filosofia, Venezia, 1565

References 

16th-century Spanish physicians
16th-century Spanish writers
16th-century male writers
Year of birth missing
Year of death missing